Matamgi Manipur is a 1972 Indian Meitei language film and the first full-length cinema of Manipur. The movie is directed by Debkumar Bose and produced by Karam Monomohan, under the banner of K.T. Films Private Limited. The black and white film features Gurumayum Ravindra Sharma and Yengkhom Roma in the lead roles. Arambam Samarendra wrote the story and screenplay by Debkumar Bose. The film won the President's Medal (Rashtriya Chalchitra Purashkar) at the 20th National Film Awards. It is an adaptation of Arambam Samarendra's theatrical play Tīrtha Yātrā.

In remembrance of the occasion of release of this first feature film of Manipur, every year, April 9 is celebrated as Mami Numit (English: Cinema Day) in the state. The film was processed at United Cine Laboratory under the supervision of Gauri Mukherjee. The credit titles (Meitei Mayek script) were written by Khun Joykumar.

The film began
shooting on 3 December 1971 and was wrapped up in January 1972.

Synopsis
The film narrates the story of a middle-class family which has votaries of the new and old values in society. They drift in different directions pulled by their diametrically opposite attitudes.

Tonsna, a retired Amin has two sons - Ibohal and Ibotombi - and a daughter, Tondonbi. Ibohal is a fashionable, easy-going and spoilt youngman. His wife, Tampak, wants to live the life of a virtuous ideal house-wife. Ibotombi is a progressive youngman who challenges all old values and feels angry why people do not understand the need to change old beliefs. Tondonbi, the sister, is a college girl, who has ultra modern ideas about life. She wants to enjoy life and in this pursuit makes the best of a given situation and the circumstance. Tonsna does not take the trouble of guiding his children or helping them adjust to the society which is slowly changing its image. The result is that Ibohal makes a mess of his life; Ibotombi is frustrated because the world of his existence does not change as fast as he would like it to do. Tondonbi also ends up in misery and desperation.

The family seems to be destined to disintegrate, but then they begin to understand each other better and decide to live together happily thereafter.

Cast
 Gurumayum Ravindra Sharma as Ibohal
 Yengkhom Roma as Tampak, Ibohal's wife
 Kangabam Birbabu as Ibotombi, Ibohal's younger brother
 Aribam Syam Sharma as Tonsna, Ibohal's father
 Elangbam Indira as Tondonbi, Ibotombi's younger sister
 Kshetrimayum Rashi as Sunita
 Wahengbam Bedamani as Memcha, Ibotombi's girlfriend
 Baby Ameeta as Ibohal's daughter
 Lokendra Arambam as Secretary at Secretariat Office
 Dr. Moirangthem Nara as Doctor
 Amujao
 Kangabam Tomba as Birjit
 Okendra

Soundtrack
Aribam Syam Sharma composed the soundtrack for the film and Khuraijam Phulendra and M. K. Binodini Devi wrote the lyrics. The playback singers are Chongtham Kamala, Arambam Jamuna and Aheibam Budhachandra. The gramophone records were done by H.M.V.

Books
Bobby Wahengbam wrote a book on the film titled Matamgi Manipur: The First Manipuri Feature Film. For the book, he won the Golden Lotus (Swarna Kamal) Award for Best Book on Cinema at the 65th National Film Awards held in 2018.

In popular culture
Haobam Paban Kumar made a documentary film named as The First Leap. It is about the get together of the cast and crew of Matamgi Manipur on a fine day in the 2000s, watching the movie, recollecting the sweet memories and having lunch.

External links

References

Meitei-language films
1972 films
Indian black-and-white films